Lauren Marie Patten (born September 22, 1992) is an American actress, singer, and writer best known for originating the role of Jo in the Broadway musical Jagged Little Pill, as well as playing Officer Rachel Witten in the crime series Blue Bloods. For her performance in Jagged Little Pill, Patten won the Tony Award for Best Featured Actress in a Musical.

Early life and education 
Patten grew up in Downers Grove, Illinois. She started acting at four, and because of this early start to her career, started homeschooling in seventh grade.

Patten briefly attended New York University and University of Southern California before graduating from The New School with a BA in Creative Writing.

Patten came out as a queer bisexual woman in 2018.

Career 
Patten started doing commercials at age four and began to perform in community theatre soon afterwards. She made her professional theatre debut when she was 12-years-old, in the Goodman Theatre's production of A Christmas Carol. At age 14, she moved to Los Angeles to participate in the Rubicon Theatre's production of A Diary of Anne Frank as the title character. Patten participated in many productions at the Rubicon, and she was nominated for a 2008 Los Angeles Stage Alliance Ovation Award for Best Featured Actress in a Play for her portrayal of Elma in Bus Stop. Patten also won a Santa Barbara Independent Award for her performance as Emily in Our Town. Patten participated in Deaf West's production of Spring Awakening as Ilse. She also portrayed Trashley in the original rock musical Home Street Home by Fat Mike of NOFX.

In 2015, Patten moved to New York City to appear in the original Broadway cast of Fun Home as the cover for Medium Alison and Joan. In 2016, Patten was the captain for Fun Home's team for the Broadway Bowling League, "The Bowl Dykes". On February 2, 2016, Patten took over the role of Medium Alison while original actor Emily Skeggs was away doing a television project until May 22, 2016. Patten then covered Medium Alison and Joan until her final performance on June 19, 2016.

In 2017, Patten played the team captain, #25, in Sarah DeLappe's play, The Wolves about a soccer team of suburban teenage girls. Patten won two awards as part of the ensemble, an Obie Award for Ensemble Performance, and a Drama Desk Award for Outstanding Ensemble. Later in 2017, Patten was the lead in the New York Musical Festival's production of The Goree All-Girl String Band where she played Reable Childs.

Patten originated the role of Jo in the Alanis Morissette jukebox musical Jagged Little Pill in the 2017 reading, and continued in the role in the original production at the American Repertory Theater in 2018. Patten won an IRNE Award for Best Supporting Actress in a large stage musical and was nominated for the 2019 Elliot Norton Award for Best Musical Performance by an Actress for her performance. Later in 2018, Patten played Jenny in Steven Levenson's play, Days of Rage at Second Stage Theatre. In the fall of 2019, Patten reprised her role of Jo in Jagged Little Pill on Broadway at the Broadhurst Theatre, where she has received critical praise, especially for her performance of "You Oughta Know". In 2020 for her portrayal of Jo she won both a Drama Desk Award for Outstanding Featured Actress in a Musical and a Tony Award for Best Featured Actress in a Musical.

Patten has been a guest star on various television programs. Some of her major credits include the recurring roles of Officer Rachel Witten on the show Blue Bloods and Polly Dean on Season 3 of The Good Fight. Other television credits include being in the guest cast for shows such as Arrested Development, Switched at Birth, and Succession.

Patten has done two concerts with her band, whose members include Damien Bassman, Eric B. Davis, and Marc Schmied. Their first performance was at Rockwood Music Hall on August 5, 2019, and her second was at The Bitter End on October 13, 2019.

Patten will star as Anna in Career Opportunities in Murder and Mayhem, set to release in September 2022.

Stage credits

Filmography

Awards and nominations

References

External links
 

1992 births
Living people
People from Downers Grove, Illinois
The New School alumni
New York University alumni
University of Southern California alumni
Actresses from Illinois
Singers from Illinois
LGBT people from Illinois
American LGBT singers
Bisexual actresses
Grammy Award winners
American queer actresses
Tony Award winners
21st-century American actresses
21st-century American singers
21st-century American women singers
American bisexual actors